Keye Luke (Cantonese: Luk Shek Kee; June 18, 1904 – January 12, 1991) was a Chinese-American film and television actor, technical advisor and artist and a founding member of the Screen Actors Guild.

He was known for playing Lee Chan, the "Number One Son" in the Charlie Chan films, the original Kato in the 1939–1941 Green Hornet film serials, Brak in the 1960s Space Ghost cartoons, Master Po in the television series Kung Fu, and Mr. Wing in the Gremlins films.

He was the first Chinese-American contract player signed by RKO, Universal Pictures and Metro-Goldwyn-Mayer and was one of the most prominent Asian actors of American cinema in the mid-20th century.

Early life
Luke was born in Guangzhou, China, to a father who owned an art shop, but he was raised in Seattle. He was part of the Luke family, a relative of Washington assistant attorney-general Wing Luke, for whom Seattle's Wing Luke Asian Museum was named. He had four siblings who all emigrated from China to California during the Great Depression. His younger brother Edwin Luke also became an actor in the Charlie Chan series.

In Seattle, Luke attended Franklin High School, where he contributed cartoons and illustrations to school publications. Keye Luke became a naturalized citizen of the United States in 1944.

Artist
Before becoming an actor, he was an artist in Seattle and, later, Hollywood. Luke worked on several of the murals inside Grauman's Chinese Theatre. He did some of the original artwork for the pressbook of the original King Kong (1933). Luke also painted a mural for the casino set in The Shanghai Gesture (1941).

He published a limited edition set of pen and ink drawings of the Rubaiyat of Omar Khayyam in the 1950s. He also created illustrations for the books The Unfinished Song of Achmed Mohammed by Earle Liederman, Blessed Mother Goose by Frank Scully and an edition of Messer Marco Polo by Brian Oswald Donn-Byrne (unpublished). Other artwork completed by Luke included the dust jackets for books published in the 1950s and 1960s. It was through his studio art work that he was recruited for his earliest movie roles.

Acting career
Luke made his film debut in The Painted Veil (1934), and the following year gained his first big role, as Charlie Chan's eldest son, Lee Chan, in Charlie Chan in Paris (1935). He worked so well with Warner Oland, the actor playing Chan, that "Number One Son" became a regular character in the series, alternately helping and distracting 'Pop' Chan in each of his murder cases. Regardless, Lee is depicted as an enthusiastic American youth of some accomplishment, including becoming an Olympic Gold Medalist in 100-metre swimming in Charlie Chan at the Olympics (1937). Luke appeared seven times as Lee Chan opposite Oland's Chan. Keye Luke left the Charlie Chan series in 1938, shortly after Oland died. The unfinished Oland-Luke film Charlie Chan at the Ringside was completed as Mr. Moto's Gamble (1938), with Luke now opposite Peter Lorre.

Unlike some performers who failed to establish themselves beyond a single role, Keye Luke continued to work prolifically in Hollywood, at several studios. Metro-Goldwyn-Mayer cast him in a recurring role in its Dr. Kildare film series, and Monogram Pictures featured him in its Frankie Darro comedies and starred him as Mr. Wong in Phantom of Chinatown. Unlike Boris Karloff, who had preceded him in the Mr. Wong role, Luke played the detective without any exotic touches. Though his Mr. Wong was of Chinese descent and able to speak Chinese, he was otherwise an ordinary American gumshoe, with no trace of a foreign accent, though he was just at home with Chinatown residents or those from China.

RKO Radio Pictures used Luke in its The Falcon series and Mexican Spitfire. Luke also worked at Universal Pictures, where he played two-fisted valet/chauffeur Kato in its Green Hornet serials. Universal mounted a low-budget serial consisting largely of action footage from older films; Keye Luke was hired to match old footage of Sabu in the serial Lost City of the Jungle (1946).

Keye Luke returned to the Chan mysteries, which were now being produced by Monogram and starred Roland Winters as Chan. "Number One Son" appeared in the last two Chan features, The Feathered Serpent (1948), along with "Number Two Son" Tommy Chan (Victor Sen Yung) in their only appearance together, and Sky Dragon (1949). In both of these films, Luke was older than the actor playing his father. Luke had a featured Broadway role in the Rodgers and Hammerstein musical Flower Drum Song, directed by Gene Kelly in 1958. The original cast album captures his singing of the part of Mr. Wang, the family patriarch.

Luke continued to play character parts in motion pictures. He had a featured role in The Chairman (1969) starring Gregory Peck. He dubbed the voice of the evil Mr. Han (played by Shih Kien) in Enter the Dragon (1973) starring Bruce Lee. Luke played the mysterious old Chinatown shopowner Mr. Wing in the two Gremlins movies and he had a significant role in Woody Allen's movie Alice (1990).

Keye Luke also worked extensively in television, making numerous guest appearances, including four on The F.B.I. and seven TV movies. He was a regular cast member in two short lived sitcoms, Anna and the King (1972) starring Yul Brynner and Sidekicks (TV 1986–87). He appeared as Lin Fong (a jade merchant) in an episode of Dragnet 1967.

In 1972, the "Number One Son" ascended to the role of Charlie Chan himself, thus becoming the first actor of Chinese descent to play the role; Luke supplied the voice of the lead role in the animated television series The Amazing Chan and the Chan Clan.

He was also known for his role of Master Po in the television series Kung Fu (1972–1975). In 1985, Luke played 'The Ancient One' on the soap opera General Hospital, for the Asian Quarter storyline, which showcased strong chemistry between Luke and young actress Kimberly McCullough, whom he mentored. In 1986, Luke appeared in season two of The Golden Girls as Sophia's love interest. Additionally Luke voiced many animated series including Brak in Space Ghost, the aforementioned Charlie Chan, and Zoltar/The Great Spirit/Colonel Cronus in Battle of the Planets.

Luke played Governor Donald Cory in an episode of the original Star Trek entitled "Whom Gods Destroy" (1969), and was going to play Doctor Noonien Soong in the Star Trek: The Next Generation episode "Brothers" but illness prevented him from doing so; Brent Spiner ultimately took over the role.

In the Fractured Fairy Tales episode "The Enchanted Fly," one of the rewards offered to the man who would rescue and marry the princess is "an autographed picture of Keye Luke."

Honors
He was awarded the Lifetime Achievement Award by Asian/Pacific American Artists in 1986. For his contribution to show business, Luke was also honored with a star on the Hollywood Walk of Fame, on the sidewalk in front of 7000 Hollywood Blvd.

Death
Luke died of a stroke on January 12, 1991, at the age of 86. He is buried at Rose Hills Memorial Park in Whittier, California.

Legacy
Writer and filmmaker Timothy Tau wrote, directed and produced a short film about Keye Luke's earlier life and work, entitled Keye Luke, which premiered at the 2012 Los Angeles Asian Pacific Film Festival as a Visual Communications Armed with a Camera Fellowship film. The film was also the Closing Night choice of the inaugural 2013 Seattle Asian American Film Festival. Feodor Chin starred as Keye Luke. Archie Kao starred as Edwin Luke, Keye Luke's brother. Kelvin Han Yee starred as Lee Luke, Keye Luke's father.

Filmography

The Painted Veil (1934) as Shay Key Fong (uncredited)
Charlie Chan in Paris (1935) as Lee Chan
The Casino Murder Case (1935) as Taki - Casino Pageboy (uncredited)
 Eight Bells (1935) as Interpreter (uncredited)
Murder in the Fleet (1935) as Consul's Secretary (uncredited)
Oil for the Lamps of China (1935) as Chinese soldier
Mad Love (1935) as Dr. Wong
Shanghai (1935) as Chinese Ambassador's son
Here's to Romance (1935) as Saito
Charlie Chan in Shanghai (1935) as Lee Chan
King of Burlesque (1936) Wong
Anything Goes (1936) as Ching (uncredited)
Charlie Chan at the Circus (1936) as Lee Chan
Charlie Chan at the Race Track (1936) as Lee Chan
Charlie Chan at the Opera (1936) as Lee Chan
The Good Earth (1937) as Elder son
Charlie Chan at the Olympics (1937) as Lee Chan
Charlie Chan on Broadway (1937) as Lee Chan 
Charlie Chan at Monte Carlo (1937) as Lee Chan
International Settlement (1938) as Dr. Wong
Mr. Moto's Gamble (1938) as Lee Chan
North of Shanghai (1939) as Jimmy Riley
Disputed Passage (1939) as Andrew Abbott
Sued for Libel (1939) as Chang Howe
Barricade (1939) as Ling - Cady's secretary
The Green Hornet (1940, serial) as Kato
Wildcat Bus (1940) as Tai (uncredited)
Phantom of Chinatown (1940) as James Lee Wong 
Comrade X (1940) as World Press Attendee with Glasses (uncredited)
No, No, Nanette (1940) as Sung, Oriental Cafe Manager (uncredited)
The Green Hornet Strikes Again! (1940, Serial) as Kato
Footlight Fever (1941) as Chinese Restaurant Waiter (uncredited)
The Gang's All Here (1941) as George Lee
They Met in Bombay (1941) as Mr. Toy (scenes deleted)
Bowery Blitzkrieg (1941) as Clancy (as Key Luke)
Passage from Hong Kong (1941) as Charlie, Chinese Waiter (uncredited)
Let's Go Collegiate (1941) as Buck Wing
Burma Convoy (1941) as Lin Taiyen
No Hands on the Clock (1941) as Severino (uncredited)
North to the Klondike (1942) as K. Wellington Wong
Mr. and Mrs. North (1942) as Kumi
A Yank on the Burma Road (1942) as Kim How
A Tragedy at Midnight (1942) as Ah Foo
Spy Ship (1942) as Koshimo Haru
Submarine Raider (1942) as Tesei (uncredited)
Invisible Agent (1942) as Surgeon
Somewhere I'll Find You (1942) as Thomas Chang (uncredited)
Across the Pacific (1942) as Steamship Office Clerk
Mexican Spitfire's Elephant (1942) as Lao Lee - Chinese Magician (uncredited)
The Falcon's Brother (1942) as Jerry - Gay's Houseboy
Destination Unknown (1942) as Secretary
Dr. Gillespie's New Assistant (1942) as Dr. Lee Wong Howe
Journey for Margaret (1942) as Japanese Statesman (uncredited)
The Adventures of Smilin' Jack (1943, Serial) as Capt. Wing
Dr. Gillespie's Criminal Case (1943) as Dr. Lee Wong Howe
Salute to the Marines (1943) as Flashy Logaz
Andy Hardy's Blonde Trouble (1944) as Dr. Lee Wong Howe
Three Men in White (1944) as Dr. Lee Wong Howe
Dragon Seed (1944)
Between Two Women (1945) as Dr. Lee Wong Howe
Secret Agent X-9 (1945, Serial) as Ah Fong
First Yank into Tokyo (1945) as Haan Soo
How Doooo You Do!!! (1945) as Chinese Detective
Tokyo Rose (1946) as Charlie Otani
Lost City of the Jungle (1946, Serial) as Tal Shan
Dark Delusion (1947) as Dr. Lee Wong Howe
Sleep, My Love (1948) as Jimmie Lin
Waterfront at Midnight (1948) as Loy
The Feathered Serpent (1948) as Lee Chan
Sky Dragon (1949) as Lee Chan
Manhandled (1949) as Chinese Laundry Owner (uncredited)
Young Man with a Horn (1950) as Ramundo the Houseboy (uncredited)
Macao (1952) (uncredited)
The Congregation (1952)
Hong Kong (1952) as Taxicab Driver (uncredited)
Fair Wind to Java (1953) as Pidada
South Sea Woman (1953) as Japanese Deck Officer (uncredited)
World for Ransom (1954) as Wong
Hell's Half Acre (1954) as Police Chief Dan
The Bamboo Prison (1954) as Comrade-Instructor Li Ching
Godzilla Raids Again (1955) as Shoichi Tsukioka (English version, voice, uncredited)
Love is a Many-Splendored Thing (1955) as Lee Foo (uncredited)
Around the World in 80 Days (1956) as old man at Yokohama travel office (uncredited)
Rodan (1956) as Narrator (English version, voice, uncredited)
Yangtse Incident: The Story of H.M.S. Amethyst (1957) as Capt. Kuo Tai
Gigantis the Fire Monster (1959) as VA for Shoichi Tsukioka (uncredited)
Nobody's Perfect (1968) as Gondai-San
Project X (1968) as Sen Chiu (as Key Luke)
The Chairman (1969) as Prof. Soong Li
Noon Sunday (1970) as Colonel Oong
The Hawaiians (1970) as Foo Sen
Won Ton Ton, the Dog Who Saved Hollywood (1976) as Cook in kitchen
The Amsterdam Kill (1977) as Chung Wei
Just You and Me, Kid (1979) as Dr. Device
Wonders of China at Walt Disney World's EPCOT Center (1982) as philosopher Li Bai
Gremlins (1984) as Grandfather
A Fine Mess (1986) as Ishimine
Dead Heat (1988) as Mr. Thule
The Mighty Quinn (1989) as Dr. Raj
Gremlins 2: The New Batch (1990) as Mr. Wing
Alice (1990) as Dr. Yang

Television

Mysteries of Chinatown  1 episode (Shadow of the Avenger) (1950)
The Stu Erwin Show 1 episode (Lin Yang in What Paper Do You Read?) (1951)
Schlitz Playhouse 1 episode (Souvenir from Singapore) (1952)
Chevron Theatre 1 episode (One Thing Leads to Another) (1952)
Your Jeweler's Showcase 1 episode (Juice Man) (1952)
Terry and the Pirates 3 episodes (Okura in Macao Gold) (1952) (Lt. Leong in The Green God) (1953) (Police Captain in Compound 3-C Theft) (1953)
Biff Baker, U.S.A. 1 episode (Tom Ling in The Hawaii Story) (1953)
Fireside Theatre 2 episodes (The Traitor) (1953) (The Reign of Amelika Joe) (1954)
The New Adventures of China Smith 4 episodes (Aban in The Sign of the Scorpion) (Tony Wan in The Talons of Tongking) (Wong in Plane to Tainan) (The Proverbs of Shen-Tze) (1954)
Studio 57 1 episode (Sam Kee in Ring Once for Death) (1954)
December Bride 1 episode (Waiter in The Chinese Dinner) (1954)
The Ray Milland Show 1 episode (Professor Wong in Chinese Luck) (1954)
My Little Margie 1 episode (Mr. Chang/Fake Mr. Lee in San Francisco Story) (1954)
Cavalcade of America (Ordeal in Burma) (1954) (Call Home the Heart) (1956) 
Big Town 1 episode (The Sniper) (1955)
Annie Oakley 1 episode (Li Wong in Annie and the Chinese Puzzle) (1955)
Soldiers of Fortune 1 episode (Captain Kopan in Jungle Rebel) (1955)
The Lineup 1 episode (The Chinatown Case) (1955)
Gunsmoke 1 episode (Chen in The Queue) (1955)
Crusader 1 episode (Lin Suchow in Christmas in Burma) (1955)
Crossroads 2 episodes (Leang Fan in Calvary in China) (1956) (Wang-Red Soldier in The Inner Light) (1956)
Jungle Jim 1 episode (Jolong in Power of Darkness) (1956)
Buffalo Bill, Jr. 1 episode (The Golden Plant) (1956)
Telephone Time 1 episode (Time Bomb) (1956)
TV Reader's Digest 1 episode (Mr. Ling in The Smuggler) (1956)
The Adventures of Dr. Fu Manchu 1 episode (Lum Sen in The Golden God of Dr. Fu Manchu) (1956)
Wire Service 1 episode (Young General in No Peace in Lo Dao) (1957)
Panic! 1 episode (Honolulu in Mayday) (1957)
Climax! 1 episode (Chen in Jacob and the Angel) (1957)
The Gale Storm Show 2 episodes (Chong in Singapore Fling) (1957) (Henry Ling in The Case of the Chinese Puzzle) (1958)
Alcoa Theatre 1 episode (Mike in In the Dark) (1958)
The Californians 1 episode (China Doll) (1958)
Mike Hammer 1 episode (Sammy Wong in So That's Who It Was) (1958)
Richard Diamond, Private Detective 1 episode  (Dr. Lin Chang in Chinese Honeymoon) (1958)
Trackdown 1 episode (Wong in Chinese Cowboy) (1958)
The Case of the Dangerous Robin 1 episode (The China Passage) (1961)
Follow the Sun 1 episode (Sumarit in Little Girl Lost) (1961)
Target: The Corruptors 1 episode (Chang Sui in Chase the Dragon) (1962)
Fair Exchange 1 episode (Mr. Fong in The Exchange) (1962)
Perry Mason 2 episodes (C.C. Chang in The Case of the Weary Watchdog) (1962) (Choy in The Case of the Feather Cloak) (1965)
The Littlest Hobo 1 episode (Wu Chang in Chinese Puzzle) (1963)
Mickey 1 episode (Grandpa Kwan in The Way the Fortune Cookie Crumbles)(1964)
Kentucky Jones 2 episodes (Thomas Wong in Ike's Song (1964) and My Old Kwantungy Home (1965))
Jonny Quest (animated) 2 episodes (voice) (Commissioner Wah/Panel truck passenger/Sentry-post 4 in The Quetong Missile Mystery) (1965) (Charlie in The Sea Haunt) (1965)I Spy 1 episode (Lt. How in Danny Was a Million Laughs) (1965)The Wackiest Ship in the Army 1 episode (Last Path to Garcia) (1965)My Brother the Angel 1 episode (Mr. Togosaki in The Hawaiian Caper) (1966)Bob Hope Presents the Chrysler Theatre 1 episode (Han in Wind Fever) (1966)Space Ghost  (animated) 3 episodes (voice) (Brak in The Lure (1966), The Looters (1967), and The Two Faces of Doom (1967)) The Green Hornet 1 episode (Mr. Chang in The Preying Mantis) (uncredited) (1966)The F.B.I. 4 episodes (General How in The Spy-Master) (1966) (Ken Torii in The Hiding Place) (1966) (Captain Cheiu in The Courier) (1967) (Mr. Seito in Memory of a Legend) (1973)Coronet Blue 1 episode (Yasito Omaki in Tomoyo) (1967)The Andy Griffith Show 1 episode (Charlie Lee in Aunt Bee's Restaurant) (1966)Family Affair 1 episode (Grandfather Chang in The Great Kow-Tow) (1967)Dragnet (1967 series) 2 episodes (The Jade Story) (1967) (The Big Amateur) (1968)The Big Valley 1 episode (Mike Chang in The Emperor of Rice) (1968)The Outsider 1 episode (Won Ah-Kam in Cold as Ashes) (1968)It Takes a Thief 2 episodes (Dubek in When Good Friends Get Together) (1968) (Dr. Tanu Woo in Project X) (1970)Star Trek: The Original Series 1 episode (Donald Cory in Whom Gods Destroy) (1969)Hawaii Five-O 1 episode (Senator John Oishi in All the King's Horses) (1969)Marcus Welby, M.D. 2 episodes (Dr. George Braley in A Woman's Place) (1971) (David Yen in A Portrait of Debbie) (1971)Adam-12 2 episodes (George Lum in Log 56: Vice Versa) (1971) (Sing Hong in Mary Hong Loves Tommy Chen) (1972)
Here's Lucy 1 episode (Quon Fong in Lucy and the Chinese Curse) (1972)
The Amazing Chan and the Chan Clan (1972) (animated) 14 episodes (voice) (Charlie Chan)
Anna and the King 13 episodes (Kralahome) (1972)
Kung Fu  46 episodes (Master Po) (1972-1975)
The Cat Creature TV movie (The Thief-Joe Sung) (1973)
Love, American Style 1 episode segment (Hi Ching in Love and the Golden Worm) (1973)
Judgement: The Court Martial of the Tiger of Malaya-General Yamashita TV movie (1974)
Judge Dee and the Monastery Murders TV movie (Lord Sun Ming) (1974)
Cannon 2 episodes (Sam in Where's Jennifer?) (1974) (Lu Chin in The Melted Man) (1975)
Harry-O 1 episode (Dr. Creighton Fong in The Mysterious Case of Lester and Dr. Fong) (1976)
Hunter 1 episode (The Back-Up) (Never broadcast)
Quincy M.E. 1 episode (Hitoshi Hiyato in Touch of Death) (1977)
Battle of the Planets  (animated) 85 episodes (voice) (Zoltar/The Great Spirit/Colonel Cronus) (1978-1980)
M*A*S*H 3 episodes (Mr. Shin in Patent 4077) (1978) (Cho Kim in A Night at Rosie's) (1979) (headmaster in Death Takes a Holiday) (1980)
Vega$ 1 episode (Henry Matsimura in Death Mountain) (1979)
Scooby-Doo and Scrappy-Doo (animated) unknown episode(s) (voices) (1979-1983)
How the West Was Won 1 episode (Leong Chung Hua in China Girl) (1979)
Thundarr the Barbarian (animated) 2 episodes (voice) (Additional voices in Secret of the Black Pearl) (1980) (Zevon in The Brotherhood of Night) (1980)
Charlie's Angels 1 episode (Lin in Island Angels) (1980)
Fly Away Home TV movie (Duc) (1981)
Spider-Man and His Amazing Friends (animated) 1 episode (voice) (Genju in Sunfire) (1981)
Bret Maverick 1 episode (Lu Sung in The Yellow Rose) (1981)
Remington Steele 1 episode (Tanaka in Your Steele the One for Me) (1982)
Voyagers! 1 episode (Kublai Khan in The Travels of Marco...and Friends) (1982)Cocaine and Blue Eyes TV movie (Tan Ng) (1983)Magnum P.I. 1 episode (Goto in Forty Years from Sand Island) (1983)Falcon Crest 2 episodes (Wilson Fong in Separate Hearts and Maelstrom) (1983)Faerie Tale Theatre 1 episode (Imperial Doctor in The Nightingale) (1983)Mister T  (animated) unknown episode(s) (voice) (1983)Alvin and the Chipmunks (animated) 13 episodes (voice) (1983)The A-Team 1 episode (Sam Yeng in The Maltese Cow) (1984)The New Mike Hammer 1 episode (Sun Woo in Hot Ice) (1984)Trapper John, M.D. 1 episode (Ronald Kwan Mein in Eternally Yours) (1984)Miami Vice 1 episode (Lao Li in Golden Triangle (Part II)) (1985)Street Hawk 1 episode (Mr. Ming in Chinatown Memories) (1985)Blade in Hong Kong TV movie (1985)Crazy Like a Fox 1 episode (Requiem for a Fox) (1985)Jem 1 episode (voice) (Battle of the Bands) (1985)MacGyver 2 episodes (Prasert in Episode 1.2 "The Golden Triangle") (1985) (Adam Chen in Murderers' Sky) (1988)General Hospital (The Ancient One in Asian Quarter) (1985)Kung Fu: The Movie (TV movie) (Master Po) (1986)T.J. Hooker 1 episode (Dr. Kenji Yakimura in Blood Sport) (1986)The Golden Girls 1 episode (Toshiro Mitsumo in Vacation) (1986)The New Adventures of Jonny Quest (animated) unknown episode(s) (voices) (1986/87)Sidekicks 13 episodes (Sabasan) (1986-87)Night Court 2 episodes (Grandfather Ho in The Apartment) (1986) (Mr. Shibata in Mac's Dilemma) (1987)Beauty and the Beast 1 episode (Master in China Moon) (1988)Friday the 13th: The Series 1 episode (Lum Chen in Tattoo) (1988)Superboy 1 episode (Sensei in The Power of Evil) (1989)

 See also 

References

Further reading
 . (Examination of the Charlie Chan feature films, with firsthand commentary by Keye Luke)
 
  Contains critical commentary on Luke's cinema.
 Luke, Allan. "Another ethnic autobiography? Childhood and the cultural economy of looking". In: Hammer, R. & Kellner, D. (Eds.) Critical Cultural Studies Reader. Peter Lang, New York, 2008: Contains a family account of Luke's work.
 Sporn, David (2017) "Keye Luke: An American Son" TGNR. retrieved 12/20 from: https://tgnreview.com/2017/08/21/keye-luke-american-son/ is a comprehensive overview of Luke's career that discusses issues of race, cinema and representation.

External links

Harmetz, Aljean (December 23, 1990). "Keye Luke: What the Doctor Called For"; The New York Times 
Obituary in The New York Times'' (January 16, 1991)

 Keye Luke papers, circa 1918-1987, Margaret Herrick Library, Academy of Motion Picture Arts and Sciences

1904 births
1991 deaths
20th-century American male actors
American male actors of Chinese descent
American male film actors
American male voice actors
American male stage actors
American male television actors
Republic of China (1912–1949) emigrants to the United States
American people of Chinese descent
Male actors from Guangzhou
Franklin High School (Seattle) alumni
Male actors from Los Angeles
Male actors from Seattle
20th Century Studios contract players
Metro-Goldwyn-Mayer contract players
Burials at Rose Hills Memorial Park